The 2016–17 NZ Touring Cars Championship was the eighteenth season of the series, and the second under the NZ Touring Cars name. The field comprised three classes racing on the same grid. Class one featured both V8ST and NZV8 TLX cars. Class two and three consisted of older NZV8 TL cars. 

Simon Evans successfully defended the title with another dominant display throughout the championship, whilst Liam MacDonald won the Class Two category.

Entrants

Calendar

Round 1 will be held in support of the 2016 ITM Auckland SuperSprint while Round 5 will be in support of the 2017 New Zealand Grand Prix.

Championship standings

References

External links

Touring Cars
Touring Cars
NZ Touring Cars Championship seasons